The 1985 WAFL season was the 101st season of the West Australian Football League and its various incarnations.

It was highlighted by the rise of Subiaco, who had nearly become extinct in the late 1970s due to financial problems and had won only 25.2 percent of its games between 1975 and 1984. The Lions recovered from a mid-season slump to win their last seven games before the finals – their longest winning streak in one season since 1915 –  and challenge East Fremantle. The Sharks came off their 1984 Grand Final loss to win their first twelve on end, gain favourable comparisons with their unbeaten 1946 counterparts, and be quoted at odds of 25/1 to achieve a perfect season. The blue and whites sealed the minor premiership with four games remaining and defeated the Lions in a thrilling Grand Final.

Major declines occurred from Claremont, who had their worst season since 1977, and East Perth, who began a sequence of five seasons with only 24 wins, two wooden spoons (their first since 1964) and two last-round escapes. Perth, who had not played finals in any grade since the 1978 Grand Final, embarked upon their first significant recruiting campaign for a decade, acquiring dissatisfied South Fremantle coach Mal Brown, former Claremont goalsneak Brett Farmer, and future mainstays Mark Watson, Wayne Ryder and Willie Dick – but did not match expectations and rose just one position with one more win than in 1984.

Off the field, the season saw Perth businessmen Alan Delany and John Watts attempt to buy lowly VFL club St. Kilda and move them to Perth, which failed but was the first move towards the modern national Australian Football League, which began in earnest with the formation of the West Coast Eagles in 1987.

Home-and-away season

Round 1

Round 2

Round 3

Round 4

Round 5

Round 6

Round 7

Round 8

Round 9

Round 10

Round 11

Round 12

Round 13

Round 14

Round 15

Round 16

Round 17

Round 18

Round 19

Round 20

Round 21

Ladder

Finals series

First semi-final

Second semi-final

Preliminary final

Grand Final

Notes
Better known as a member of the West Australian Football Commission and author of the “Fong Report” on the future of West Australian football after the 2000 season.

References

External links
Official WAFL website
West Australian Football League (WAFL), 1985

West Australian Football League seasons
WAFL